H. P. Lovecraft (born 1890) was an American writer.

Lovecraft or H. P. Lovecraft may also refer to:

Books 
 Lovecraft: A Look Behind the Cthulhu Mythos, 1972 book by Lin Carter
 Lovecraft: A Biography, 1975 biography by L. Sprague de Camp

Film and television 
 Lovecraft: Fear of the Unknown, 2008 documentary
 Lovecraft (Gotham), 2014 episode

Music 
 H. P. Lovecraft (band), 1967 American rock band formed in Chicago, Illinois
 H. P. Lovecraft (album), 1967
 H. P. Lovecraft II, 1968

Other uses 
 Lovecraft (crater), a crater on Mercury

See also
 Lovecraft Country (disambiguation)